Ron Kresha (born December 16, 1969) is an American politician serving in the Minnesota House of Representatives since 2013. A member of the Republican Party of Minnesota, Kresha represents District 10A in north-central Minnesota, which includes the city of Little Falls and parts of Aitkin, Crow Wing, Kanabec, Mille Lacs and Morrison Counties.

Education
Kresha attended St. Cloud State University, graduating with a B.A. in English, and Bellevue University, graduating with a M.B.A. in finance and accounting.

Minnesota House of Representatives
Kresha was elected to the Minnesota House of Representatives in 2012 and has been reelected every two years since. During the 2015-16 legislative session, he served as an assistant majority leader. In 2017-18, he was the majority whip for the Republican House caucus. Kresha is the minority lead on the Education Finance Committee and serves on the Ways and Means Committee.

Electoral history

Personal life
Kresha is married to his wife, Wendy. They have five children and reside in Little Falls, Minnesota.

References

External links

Rep. Ron Kresha official Minnesota House of Representatives website
Rep. Ron Kresha official campaign website

1969 births
21st-century American politicians
Living people
Republican Party members of the Minnesota House of Representatives
St. Cloud State University alumni
Bellevue University alumni